The Middle English creole hypothesis is the concept that the English language is a creole, which is typically a language that developed from a pidgin. The vast differences between Old English and Middle English have led some historical linguists to claim that the language underwent creolisation at around the 11th century, during the Norman conquest of England.

History

The theory was first proposed in 1977 by C. Bailey and K. Maroldt and has found both supporters and detractors in the academic world. Different versions of the hypothesis refer to creolisation by contact between Old English and Norman French, between Old English and Old Norse or even interaction between Common Brittonic and English, however evidence supporting the influence of the Celtic languages on English is hampered by a lack of written sources.

The argument in favour of the Middle English creole hypothesis comes from the extreme reduction in inflected forms from Old to Middle English. The declension of nouns was radically simplified and analogised. The verb system also lost many old patterns of conjugation. Many strong verbs were reanalysed as weak verbs. The subjunctive mood became much less distinct. Syntax was also simplified somewhat, with word order becoming more rigid. Those grammatical simplifications resemble those observed in pidgins, creoles and other contact languages, which arise when speakers of different languages need to communicate. Such contact languages usually lack the inflections of either parent language or drastically simplify them.

Rebuttal
The Middle English creole hypothesis has been rejected by multiple researchers. A thorough rebuttal was presented by Sarah Thomason and Terrence Kaufman. They consider the case for creolization with Old Norse or a French dialect but conclude that in both cases the observed influences can be best explained through moderate borrowing. They specifically note that claimed influences on morphology and syntax are the long-term outcomes of internal processes which began in English before the relevant period, and that the heaviest period of borrowing for French vocabulary occurred after that language ceased to be spoken by most elites. They also note that a number of innovations in English during this period are also seen in other Germanic languages, suggesting that wider historical-linguistic trends were influencing the language.

Another key argument against the creole hypothesis is that English retains a high number (283) of irregular verbs, just like other Germanic languages, a linguistic trait that is usually the first to disappear in creoles and pidgins.

See also
 English-based creole languages
 History of English
 Influence of French on English

References

Bibliography
 Curzan, Anne (2003) Gender Shifts in the History of English (section 2.6 The gender shift and the Middle English creole question)
 Dalton-Puffer, Christiane (1995) "Middle English is a Creole and its Opposite: on the value of plausible speculation" in Jacek Fisiak (ed), Linguistic Change Under Contact Conditions
 Görlach, Manfred (1986) Middle English: a creole? in Dieter Kastovsky, et al. (eds), Linguistics Across Historical and Geographical Boundaries
 Thomason, Sarah Grey & Kaufman, Terrence (1988) Language Contact, Creolization, and Genetic Linguistics

External links
 Brandy Ryan, "Middle English as Creole: “Still trying not to refer to you lot as ‘bloody colonials’”", University of Toronto, 2005

Linguistic typology
History of the English language
Linguistic theories and hypotheses
Creole hypothesis
Language contact
Pidgins and creoles